García is a municipality located to the northwest of the Monterrey metropolitan area in the state of Nuevo León, Mexico.  García had, according to the 2005 census, a population of 145,867 persons.  It borders the municipalities of Mina, Escobedo and Hidalgo to the north; to the south and east with Santa Catarina; and to the west with the state of Coahuila.

Origin of the name

The municipality was named in honor of a Nuevo León native Joaquín García, who was born in the city and who served two terms as governor of the state of Nuevo León.  Before the name change, the municipality was called Hacienda de San Juan el Bautista de Pesquería Grande.

Economy
Aviacsa, before they ceased operations, and Nemak, a part of ALFA have their headquarters in the city. Johnson Controls, the largest American auto battery company, has its lead acid battery recycling plant located in Garcia.

References

External links
Official website of Municipality of García

Populated places in Nuevo León
Monterrey metropolitan area